Panic Time (German: Panische Zeiten) is a 1980 West German comedy film directed by  Peter Fratzscher and starring Udo Lindenberg, Vera Tschechowa and Walter Kohut. 

The film's sets were designed by the art director Toni Lüdi. Shooting took place in Dortmund, Hamburg and Munich. The film's soundtrack was released on the album Panische Zeiten.

Cast
 Udo Lindenberg as Self / Carl Coolman
 Leata Galloway as Vera
 Walter Kohut as Minister Dr. Kurt Kling
 Vera Tschechowa as Frau Dr. Wunder
 Felix Scholz as Bodyguard Felix
 Klaus Kauroff as Bodyguard Klaus
 Otto Wanz as Bodyguard Otto
 Hark Bohm as Peitschenperverser Dr. Gerhard Kühn
 Beate Jensen as Wiebke Stinksterff von Löloland
 Eddie Constantine as Lemmy Caution
 Rudolf Beiswanger as Leuchtturmwärter Süchtig
 Peter Ahrweiler as Professor McNaughton
 Fritz Rau as Self
 Heinz Domez as Entführer
 Werner Böhm as Entführer
 Willi Hermann as Entführer
 Renate Schubert as Prostituierte Rosa
 Egon Müller as Self
 Jürgen Baumgarten as Motorradfahrer
 Karl Dall as Vögelwart

References

Bibliography
Hans-Michael Bock and Tim Bergfelder. The Concise Cinegraph: An Encyclopedia of German Cinema. Berghahn Books, 2009.
 Hake, Sabine. German National Cinema. Routledge, 2002.

External links 
 

1980 films
1980s musical comedy films
German musical comedy films
West German films
1980s German-language films
Films directed by Peter Fratzscher
1980s German films